The 1940 Football Championship of UkrSSR were part of the 1940 Soviet republican football competitions in the Soviet Ukraine.

Persha Hrupa
Promoted:
 (Druha Hrupa) Avanhard Horlivka
 (debut) Zenit Kharkiv
 (reinstated) Spartak Dnipropetrovsk
Relegated: Dzerzhynets Voroshylovhrad

 FC Stal Kostiantynivka withdrew from competitions

Druha Hrupa
Promoted:
 (Tretia Hrupa) Tsukrovyk Sumy, Spartak Poltava
 (reinstated) Stal Voroshylovsk
Relegated: Sudnobudivnyk-2 Mykolaiv

Tretia Hrupa
Promoted: Spartak Vinnytsia
Replaced: Voskhod Zhytomyr → Dynamo Zhytomyr, Dynamo Kamianets-Podilskyi → Dynamo Proskurov

Ukrainian clubs at the All-Union level
 Group A (2): Dynamo Kyiv, Stakhanovets Stalino
 Group B (5): Dynamo Kharkiv, Sudnobudivnyk Mykolaiv, Silmash Kharkiv, Lokomotyv Kyiv, Kharchovyk Odesa

Withdrawn
 (all-Union level) Stal (z-d im. Lenina) Dnipropetrovsk, Stal (z-d im. Petrovskoho) Dnipropetrovsk, Dynamo Dnipropetrovsk, Traktor Kharkiv, Spartak Kharkiv, Spartak Kyiv, Dynamo Odesa
 (Republican) Spartak Kryvyi Rih, Kryla Rad Zaporizhia, Kharchovyk Tiraspol, Temp Vinnytsia, Stal Makiivka, Stakhanovets Krasnoarmiysk, Lokomotyv Synelnykove, Znannia Kherson, z-d im. Lenina Verkhiy, Stakhanovets Lysychansk, Lokomotyv Lozova, Lokomotyv Kharkiv, Lokomotyv Dnipropetrovsk, Dynamo-2 Kyiv, Zenit Stalino, Zenit Voroshylovhrad, z-d im. Stalina Stalino, z-d KinAp Odesa, UDKA Kyiv, Stalinets Kharkiv, Voskhod Zhytomyr, Dynamo Kamianets-Podilskyi, Krasnyi Luch, Chystiakove, Melitopol, Berdiansk, Berdychiv, Novohrad-Volynskyi, Korosten, Mohyliv-Podilskyi, Uman, Koziatyn, Voznesensk, Kremenchuk, Konotop, Smila, Kupiansk, Starobilsk, Artemivsk, Sloviansk

See also
 1940 Cup of the Ukrainian SSR

References

External links
 1940. Football Championship of the UkrSSR (1940. Первенство УССР.) Luhansk Nash Futbol.
 Group 1: 1940. Football Championship of the UkrSSR. ukr-football.org.ua
 Group 2: 1940. Football Championship of the UkrSSR. ukr-football.org.ua
 Group 3: 1940. Football Championship of the UkrSSR. ukr-football.org.ua
 1940. Football Championship of the UkrSSR. regional-football.ru
 1940. Football Championship of the UkrSSR. footballfacts.ru

Ukraine
Football Championship of the Ukrainian SSR
Championship